The Death Eaters are characters featured in the Harry Potter series of novels and films. They are a radical group of wizards and witches, led by the dark wizard Lord Voldemort, who seek to purify the wizarding community by eliminating wizards and witches born to non-magical parents. They attempt to create a new order within the Ministry of Magic by spreading fear through the wizarding community and murdering those who speak out against them. Their primary opposition is the Order of the Phoenix.

Death Eaters recognise one another by the Dark Mark, a sigil branded on each of their left forearms that allows Voldemort to summon any of them instantly. Their typical attire includes black hooded robes and masks. The Death Eaters as a group first appeared in the novel Harry Potter and the Goblet of Fire, although individual members of the group, such as Severus Snape, Lucius Malfoy, and Peter Pettigrew had appeared in earlier books in the series. The group had also been mentioned indirectly in Harry Potter and the Philosopher's Stone and in Harry Potter and the Chamber of Secrets, when followers of Voldemort were mentioned. They were mentioned the first time directly in Harry Potter and the Prisoner of Azkaban.

Synopsis

Pre-Harry Potter 
The Death Eaters first existed over 11 years before the events of the books, torturing and murdering Muggles (people without magical abilities), as well as anyone who opposed them, including wizards who support Muggles (such as the Weasley family). Around 10 years after the Death Eaters first surfaced, a Seer named Sybill Trelawney made a prophecy about a boy who would have the power to defeat Voldemort forever. The prophecy could have referred to two different boys, Harry Potter or Neville Longbottom; however, Voldemort chose Harry as said in the prophecy, that "the Dark Lord would mark him as his equal". As Voldemort was a half-blood, he chose his "equal", Harry, whose mother was a Muggle-born witch, instead of Neville, who came from a long line of pure-blooded wizards. Acting on information from James and Lily Potter's Secret-Keeper Peter Pettigrew, Voldemort attempted to complete the prophecy and kill his infant rival. Due to Harry's mother's sacrifice to save her son, Voldemort's deadly curse rebounded off Harry and disembodied Voldemort.

With Voldemort vanquished after failing to kill Harry Potter, the Death Eaters largely disbanded and vanished. The Ministry rounded many of them up and imprisoned them in the Wizarding prison Azkaban,  but some eluded justice by claiming they were bewitched by the Imperius Curse (it is implied that Lucius Malfoy did so) or by turning in other Death Eaters, as Igor Karkaroff did; Harry witnesses Karkaroff's testimony against former Death Eaters in Albus Dumbledore's Pensieve during the course of the series. It appears that very few Death Eaters stood for their fallen master and proudly went to Azkaban for him (like Bellatrix Lestrange), since, in the sixth book, Snape states that if Voldemort had refused to welcome back all those who turned their backs on him when he fell, then he would have very few followers. The Lestranges are the only Death Eaters known to have willingly sacrificed their freedom for Voldemort. Voldemort takes notice of this and claims that they will be rewarded above all others for their great loyalty. Snape's position as a Death Eater is unique – during the books he convinces all (with the exception of Dumbledore) that he is working for whichever side requires it at that time. This is due to his skill at Occlumency allowing him to disguise his true motive – a love for Lily Potter – from Voldemort.

Re-emergence 
Early in Harry Potter and the Goblet of Fire a group of Death Eaters rallied after the Quidditch World Cup. They gathered to form a large spectacle and disturbance which spread instant chaos and fear amongst the wizarding community. Their appearance alone created hysteria, and their numbers grew while they tortured Muggles and Muggle-borns on site. It concluded when the Dark Mark was produced in the sky by Barty Crouch Jr, frightening Death Eaters and Ministry officials alike.
Voldemort, having regained his full strength at the end of Harry Potter and the Goblet of Fire, summoned his followers to him by touching Peter Pettigrew's Dark Mark. Except for Severus Snape (who was staying at Hogwarts to "maintain his cover") and those dead, imprisoned, or afraid to return, the majority returned to his service as Voldemort began his second attempt to claim all power.

Voldemort states at his rebirth, "And here we have six missing Death Eaters...three dead in my service. One, too cowardly to return...he will pay. One, who I believe has left me forever...he will be killed, of course...and one, who remains my most faithful servant, and who has already reentered my service."
Based on mentions and later happenings in the books, it can be deduced that the one "too cowardly to return" is Igor Karkaroff. The one "who I believe has left me forever" is Severus Snape, who returns two hours later to explain his absence and convince Voldemort that he is a spy for him. The "most faithful servant" is Barty Crouch Jr., who has already been in place at Hogwarts working for Voldemort. The three dead include Evan Rosier, Wilkes and Regulus Black.

The Minister for Magic (Cornelius Fudge) deluded himself into believing that Voldemort could not have come back and that it was all a lie cooked up by Dumbledore, who Fudge believed had designs on his political office. The Death Eaters use this tactical advantage throughout Harry Potter and the Order of the Phoenix to maintain their secrecy. Because of the Ministry's refusal to remove the Dementors from Azkaban, which Dumbledore advised immediately following Voldemort's return, the Death Eaters recruited the Dementors to their cause and made similar progress with the giants; the Dementors' revolt against the Ministry of Magic also allowed the Death Eaters to bolster their ranks with the mass break-out of several imprisoned Death Eaters, including Bellatrix Lestrange.

In Harry Potter and the Order of the Phoenix, Voldemort sent a group of Death Eaters, led by Lucius Malfoy, into the Department of Mysteries, where he expected them to secure a prophecy of vital importance to him: having originally attacked Harry Potter based upon a partial recounting of it, he now wanted to hear the full version to better, or even fully, understand the connection between Harry and himself.  The raid on the Department failed, however; Harry Potter and his friends delayed the Death Eaters and kept the prophecy out of their hands, finally destroying it, and were eventually aided by Albus Dumbledore and the Order of the Phoenix. Dumbledore captured all of the Death Eaters except for Bellatrix, sending Voldemort and her fleeing after a fierce duel with the former, and ending the Death Eaters' enjoyed secrecy.  Lucius, who had been important both to the Death Eaters and within the Ministry, was captured and imprisoned.  However, the Death Eaters regrouped, assassinating and kidnapping important wizards, killing Muggles, and in general spreading terror and chaos through the Wizarding world.  Soon after Lucius' capture, his son Draco Malfoy is given the task of killing Albus Dumbledore, although this task is eventually performed by Severus Snape.

Towards the end of Harry Potter and the Half-Blood Prince, the Death Eaters attacked Hogwarts for the first time, leading to the death of Albus Dumbledore and injuries to several of the school's defenders.  A second, more deadly attack near the conclusion of Harry Potter and the Deathly Hallows resulted in over 50 deaths, including Voldemort, who died when the Killing Curse he threw at Harry rebounded on him.  Voldemort's death signalled the end of all Death Eaters.

Ideology 
Voldemort's Death Eaters practise illegal and dangerous spells known as dark magic. They follow a racist ideology that places pure-blooded wizards at the top of a racial hierarchy, above all other magical or non-magical people and entities. They believe wizards are, as a genealogy book within the story phrases it, "Nature's Nobility"; other magical creatures and the non-magical are inferior and should be subjugated. Within the wizarding community, only those who are born to wizard parents are worthy of magical power, despite the fact that parentage does not in fact determine who possess such powers. They categorise wizards according to blood purity; "pure bloods" (those with only wizards as parents) out-rank "half-bloods" (mixed parentage) and "mudbloods", a derogatory name for those born to non-magical parents (Muggles). Death Eaters have also attacked pure-bloods who oppose them. Examples of this are pure-blooded members of the Order of the Phoenix such as Sirius Black, the Prewett brothers, who were murdered because of their loyalties, and the entire Weasley family. Such people are often called "blood traitors" by those who subscribe to Death Eater ideologies.

In reality, the idea of blood purity is a misnomer – Voldemort himself is a half-blood – and it is unlikely that all of them could be pure-bloods, as very few, if any, such people could exist given the small gene pool. In Half-Blood Prince, Rowling depicts the Gaunts as a family who are obsessed with their ancestry and driven to inbreeding to preserve its integrity. Rowling has stated on her website that there are no true pure-blood families left but that those who call themselves such simply strike Muggles, Squibs, and half-bloods from their family records. On the other hand, "in rare circumstances" a Muggle-born wizard can become a Death Eater. They are also not above recruiting creatures they deem inferior, as proven by werewolf Fenrir Greyback and the giant clan from continental Europe, as long as they help further the larger Death Eater agenda.

The Death Eaters seek complete power and control over the entire Wizarding world, wishing to restrict leadership to a small band of pure-bloods. The Death Eaters not only seek the restoration of pure-blood rule over the Wizarding community, but also the eventual subjugation of the Muggle community under Wizarding rule.  During their control over the Ministry of Magic, they severely persecuted Muggle-born wizards, sending them to Azkaban for life or feeding them to Dementors.

Death Eaters and their crimes 

The following characters are Death Eaters identified by name during the series, and the crimes they committed.

Notable Death Eaters

Alecto and Amycus Carrow 
Alecto and Amycus Carrow are siblings who participate in the assault on Hogwarts at the end of Harry Potter and the Half-Blood Prince. Amycus is described as being squat and lumpy, with a lopsided leer and a wheezy giggle; Alecto is described as a "stocky little woman" and shares her brother's squatness and laugh. It is said that after Voldemort's first downfall, they believed that he was gone forever.

In Harry Potter and the Deathly Hallows, Alecto and Amycus become "teachers" at Hogwarts, severely disciplining students who oppose Voldemort. Amycus teaches Defence Against the Dark Arts, but as Neville Longbottom puts it, it becomes just "The Dark Arts" in which students are forced to perform the Cruciatus Curse against students who have been assigned to detention. Alecto teaches Muggle Studies, which becomes a compulsory subject, and teaches students that Muggles are like animals. Right before the Battle of Hogwarts, Alecto waits in Ravenclaw Tower on Voldemort's orders, preparing to capture Harry, but is stunned by Luna Lovegood after touching her Dark Mark to summon Voldemort. Amycus, after seeing what happened, tries to conspire with Minerva McGonagall who helped him into the room to offer some Ravenclaw students as sacrifices to Voldemort while planning to use the lie that Ravenclaws had ambushed Alecto and forced her to press her Dark Mark. McGonagall refuses and argues with Amycus, who spits in her face. Enraged at this, Harry casts the Cruciatus Curse, with such power that Amycus passes out. Later, McGonagall places the Imperius Curse on him, then binds him with his sister and places him inside a net.

Ralph Ineson plays Amycus, and Suzie Toase appears as Alecto in the films, wherein they are reduced to non-speaking roles. In the second part of the final film, Snape deflects a spell from McGonagall which hits the Carrows, possibly to protect the students from their abuses and to show his allegiance to Dumbledore.

Barty Crouch Jr

Bartemius "Barty" Crouch, Junior is captured by the Ministry of Magic along with Bellatrix, Rodolphus, and Rabastan Lestrange, who tortured the Aurors Frank and Alice Longbottom into insanity. His father, Barty Crouch Sr., who heads the Department of Magical Law Enforcement at this time, sentences him to life imprisonment in Azkaban. However, he later rescues his son as a favour to his dying wife. When they visit him in Azkaban, Mrs. Crouch uses Polyjuice Potion to switch appearances with her son, enabling him to escape while she remains in his place. When she dies, she is buried under his identity. Crouch Jr. is nursed back to health by Winky, the family's house-elf.

To prevent him from returning to Voldemort's service, Crouch Sr. controls his son with the Imperius Curse and keeps him hidden under an invisibility cloak. When Bertha Jorkins discovers the truth, the news reaches Voldemort, who rescues Crouch Jr. and puts Crouch Sr. under the Imperius Curse. Crouch Jr. then imprisons Alastor "Mad-Eye" Moody, a famous Auror, and uses Polyjuice Potion to assume Moody's appearance and infiltrate Hogwarts as the new Defence Against the Dark Arts teacher. Despite not being a real teacher, Crouch Jr. does a fair job and the class learns many things from him, including valuable knowledge related to the three "Unforgivable Curses". Crouch Sr. escapes and, exhausted and delirious from the Imperius Curse, reaches Hogwarts to tell Dumbledore about Voldemort's return. However, his son murders him on the castle grounds, transfigures the body into a bone, and buries the bone in freshly turned earth in front of Hagrid's cabin.

The revived Triwizard Tournament is held at Hogwarts, and Voldemort tasks Crouch Jr. with making sure Harry wins. To do so, he puts Harry's name in the Goblet of Fire, bewitches Viktor Krum to attack Cedric Diggory in the maze, and stuns Fleur Delacour. When Harry and Cedric simultaneously touch the Triwizard Cup, which is a portkey, it transports them to the graveyard in Little Hangleton, home of the Riddle family. There, after killing Cedric, Death Eater Peter Pettigrew uses Harry's blood in a ritual that re-embodies Voldemort. The Dark Lord attempts to kill Harry, but with the help of the ghost-echoes from Voldemort's wand, Harry escapes via the Portkey.

When Harry reappears at Hogwarts, the still-disguised Crouch Jr. hopes to succeed where his master failed; however, Dumbledore, Snape, and McGonagall foil his plot. Under the effects of Veritaserum, he recounts his plan to them. Although he is closely guarded so he can later repeat his testimony, a Dementor acting as bodyguard to Minister of Magic Cornelius Fudge attacks Crouch and sucks out his soul before anyone can stop it. Crouch thus lives in a vegetative state, bereft of his memories or sense of self.

He is played by David Tennant in the film adaptation of Harry Potter and the Goblet of Fire.

Antonin Dolohov 
Antonin Dolohov (Cyrillic: Антонин Дологов) has a long, pale, and twisted face, with a name that suggests he is of Slavic descent. He is confirmed in Harry Potter and the Half-Blood Prince to be one of Voldemort's first Death Eaters, being present at the Hog's Head when Voldemort comes to Hogwarts to request a teaching position and hide the diadem of Ravenclaw around 1956. Dolohov is one of the five Death Eaters who murder Gideon and Fabian Prewett (Molly Weasley's brothers). He also tortures many Muggles and opponents of Voldemort during the first war. Dolohov is imprisoned in Azkaban but escapes during the mass break-out.

He participates in the battle of the Department of Mysteries, where he injures Hermione, but is imprisoned again and returns to Azkaban. He escapes once more some time before the events of Harry Potter and the Deathly Hallows. He tracks Harry, Ron, and Hermione to a Muggle cafe after they use Voldemort's name (which had recently been made taboo). He and his companion Rowle are then stunned, have their memories erased by Hermione, and are punished by Voldemort. Dolohov later participates in the Battle of Hogwarts, killing Remus Lupin,. He is also seen dueling with Dean Thomas until Parvati Patil uses the Body-Bind Curse on him. Dolohov and Yaxley are later sent to look for Harry, and they mistakenly think the boy will not give himself up. When the battle recommences, Professor Flitwick finally defeats him.

He is portrayed by Arben Bajraktaraj in the film adaptations of Harry Potter and the Order of the Phoenix and Harry Potter and the Deathly Hallows – Part 1.

Fenrir Greyback
Fenrir Greyback is a werewolf involved with the Death Eaters. He works alongside Lord Voldemort because of his promises of fairness to werewolves around the country. He does not carry the Dark Mark as he is not a Death Eater. He is known as the most savage werewolf ever to live and is greatly feared throughout the wizarding world. To fulfil his agenda of creating as many werewolves as possible, Greyback has infected scores of people, including the young Remus Lupin. Greyback is known for targeting young children, and positions himself close to his victims when the moon is almost full. Unlike most werewolves, Greyback thirsts for blood even in his human form. In Harry Potter and the Half-Blood Prince, Greyback first appears on the night of Dumbledore's death, when he attacks Harry and badly scars Bill Weasley. Although Greyback does not transmit his lycanthropy because he was in human form at the time, Bill is subsequently shown to have slightly changed, for instance gaining a preference for very rare meat.

In Harry Potter and the Deathly Hallows, Greyback leads a gang of Snatchers, Dark wizards looking for Muggle-borns and "Undesirables" in exchange for gold. When Harry accidentally uses Voldemort's name after it has been made taboo, Greyback is alerted and his gang attacks their camp. Harry, Ron, and Hermione are kidnapped by the Snatchers and are taken to Malfoy Manor. Bellatrix Lestrange promises Hermione to Greyback in return for his services, but the prisoners fight their way out and escape, Greyback being hit by a triple Stunning Spell. Greyback later agrees to aid Voldemort in the Battle of Hogwarts. During the battle, Hermione, using a blasting curse, prevents Greyback from attacking an injured Lavender Brown, and a crystal ball thrown by Professor Trelawney stuns him. He rejoins the battle in time for the Death Eaters' last stand, when Ron Weasley and Neville Longbottom combine forces to take him down.

Dave Legeno portrayed Greyback in the film adaptation of Harry Potter and the Half-Blood Prince. He reprised the role in both parts of Harry Potter and the Deathly Hallows.

Igor Karkaroff 
Igor Karkaroff (Cyrillic: Игорь Каркаров) is the Headmaster at Durmstrang Institute, one of the three schools (together with Hogwarts and Beauxbatons Academy) that enter the Triwizard Tournament. As Headmaster, Karkaroff is also one of the judges. He is described as a neat, fussy-looking man with an oily voice and manner who sports a small grey goatee. While unctuously pleasant most of the time, he is capable of violent rage. He is also described as "a man with yellowish teeth whose smile does not reach his cold stare". Karkaroff is angered and threatens to withdraw from the tournament when Harry is selected as a fourth champion and second representative for Hogwarts. Although he is talked down and agrees to stay, he nevertheless shows evident favouritism towards the Durmstrang champion, Bulgarian Quidditch player Viktor Krum.
Sirius Black later identifies Karkaroff as a former Death Eater. Karkaroff was captured by Auror Alastor Moody and imprisoned in Azkaban. Karkaroff later told the Ministry of Magic that he had seen the error of his ways, and "named names", putting many people in Azkaban in exchange for his freedom. Karkaroff is thus also hated by the Death Eaters. Karkaroff's history gives him a connection with Snape, also a former Death Eater. Karkaroff interrupts a Potions lesson demanding to talk to Snape, and shows him his Dark Mark reappearing. He also apparently has an unpleasant history with Alastor Moody, and tries to avoid him unsuccessfully for the entirety of the tournament, not knowing that it is Barty Crouch Jr. in disguise. At the end of the novel, following Voldemort's return, Karkaroff goes into hiding, leaving behind his student charges at Durmstrang. In the sixth novel, Harry Potter and the Half-Blood Prince, Remus Lupin states that Karkaroff was found dead in a shack with the Dark Mark hovering over it, an indication that he was killed by other Death Eaters. Lupin also expresses surprise that Karkaroff managed to live even a year after deserting Voldemort and that no one else has been known to avoid capture quite as long.

Predrag Bjelac appeared as Karkaroff in the film adaptation of Goblet of Fire.

Bellatrix Lestrange 

Bellatrix Lestrange (née Black) is the first female Death Eater introduced in the books. Aunt of Draco Malfoy and Nymphadora Tonks. She was introduced in Harry Potter and the Order Of The Phoenix. She is  the most faithful member of Voldemort's inner circle. She is described as being highly attractive yet emaciated due to her time in Azkaban. Bellatrix is portrayed as paranoid, insane, sadistic, and fanatically devoted to Voldemort, seeing service to him as the noblest duty for any true wizard or witch. Bellatrix takes an obvious pleasure in acts of torture and cruelty, as demonstrated when she kills her cousin, Sirius Black and niece Nymphadora Tonks, and tortures Hermione and Griphook at Malfoy manor. She is a witch of prodigious ability, as demonstrated by her many victories in duels against other characters, and as noted by Harry in the final book. She marries Rodolphus Lestrange and has a child with her "boss" Lord Voldemort named Delphini. She was killed by Molly Weasley by an unknown spell.

Helena Bonham Carter appears as Bellatrix Lestrange in the films

Draco Malfoy 
 Draco Malfoy is the pure blooded son of Lucius and Narcissa Malfoy. He was a notorious bully to Harry Potter and his friends throughout the series. Draco becomes a Death Eater in his sixth year at Hogwarts and is assigned to kill Dumbledore. However, he fails and Dumbledore is ultimately killed by Snape. Draco, like his family, is part of Slytherin house. Draco repaired a vanishing cabinet to let the death eaters in from the inside.

He is portrayed by Tom Felton in all of the films and by Tom Stephens in the Cursed Child

Lucius Malfoy
Lucius Malfoy is a Death Eater, head of a wealthy pure-blood wizarding family. He lives with his wife Narcissa Malfoy (née Black) and their son Draco at the Malfoy Manor in Wiltshire. Lucius was a school governor of Hogwarts before being sacked, and has very close connections at the Ministry of Magic. To maintain his reputation and influence, he makes donations to the Ministry, to charity, and to St Mungo's Hospital. He was educated at Hogwarts, where he was a prefect in Slytherin House.

He debuts as the main antagonist in Harry Potter and the Chamber of Secrets, in which just before Draco and Harry's second year at Hogwarts, Lucius plants Tom Riddle's diary in Ginny Weasley's potions cauldron while she is shopping for school supplies at Flourish & Blotts, in a plot to use her to reopen the Chamber of Secrets, which would lead to attacks on Muggle-born students.

Lucius knows the diary is cleverly enchanted, but is not aware that it is a horcrux containing a part of Voldemort's soul. He is careless with it and punished by Voldemort himself. Lucius intends to use the opening of the Chamber of Secrets by Ginny to discredit her father, Arthur Weasley, and Dumbledore. Lucius' plans are ultimately thwarted with the help of the Malfoys' house-elf Dobby, and Harry, but not before the Chamber is opened and Lucius uses the ensuing terror (and threats to attack their families) to influence the school's Board of Governors to discredit and dismiss Dumbledore as Headmaster.

Subsequently, Harry tricks Lucius into setting Dobby free. Upon this, Lucius attempts to attack Harry with his wand but Dobby disarms him before he can do any harm. Lucius is ultimately stripped of his title as a Hogwarts school governor. Despite his sacking, he still maintains strong ties with the Ministry of Magic.

Lucius next appears in the beginning of Harry Potter and the Goblet of Fire during the Quidditch World Cup, sharing prime seats in the Top Box with Minister for Magic Cornelius Fudge. Later in that book, when Voldemort rises again and summons his Death Eaters, Malfoy rejoins him and asserts that he had done everything he could to help his master, who however remains unimpressed. Harry reports Malfoy's declarations to Minister Fudge, who refuses to believe him. Thus, the wealthy Malfoy continues to maintain strong ties with the Ministry.

During the climax of Harry Potter and the Order of the Phoenix, Malfoy is the leader of the Death Eaters who are sent to retrieve the prophecy from Harry in the Hall of Prophecy. Lucius tries several ways to get the prophecy from Harry without breaking it, but the boy and his friends manage to escape from the Hall. Malfoy finally meets him in the Death Chamber, where Harry is about to give it to Malfoy when the Order of the Phoenix breaks into the Ministry and begins to duel with the Death Eaters. Dumbledore himself arrives at the end of the battle and Malfoy is captured and sent to Azkaban.

By the final book, Voldemort has given Malfoy his freedom, though he looks significantly the worse for wear, having lost Voldemort's favour. Voldemort treats him with great contempt by hijacking his house for Headquarters, and is forcing his son to do dark deeds against his nature, sparking sympathy for the notorious family for the first time in the series. Voldemort borrows Lucius' wand which is accidentally destroyed by Harry Potter. Later in the book, Lucius, along with his wife and sister-in-law, accidentally allow Harry and his friends to escape from Malfoy Manor. Voldemort punishes them severely, eventually putting them under house arrest.

Despite his long-standing position as a Death Eater and Voldemort's advocate of pure-blood supremacy, Lucius decides his love for his family is more important than his involvement in the war. During the Battle of Hogwarts, he pleads with Voldemort to let him onto the battlefield to locate his son. He and the rest of his family are reunited at the end of the book. Following Voldemort's death, Lucius, Narcissa, and Draco all manage to "weasel their way out" of being sent to Azkaban due to Narcissa's aiding Harry in the Forbidden Forest.

Lucius's ultimate fate after Deathly Hallows is unknown, but actor Jason Isaacs stated in an interview with Syfy Wire that he believes Lucius would not feel like a member of wizarding society again after Voldemort's fall, as society would shun him. Isaacs also states that Lucius would become a shell of his former self, lose the respect of his wife and son, protect himself with his money, and drink himself into an early death.

According to Forbes magazine, in 2006, Lucius Malfoy was number 12 on their Forbes Fictional 15 list.

In the film series, Lucius is portrayed by Jason Isaacs as an adult. Scenes with Tony Coburn as a teenage Lucius were cut from the final movie.

Peter Pettigrew 
Peter Pettigrew, (a.k.a. Wormtail), is the only Death Eater known to have been in a House other than Slytherin (Gryffindor) while at Hogwarts. There, he was a close friend of Sirius Black, James Potter, and Remus Lupin, although he was the least intelligent and least talented of the group. With Sirius and James' help, Pettigrew becomes an Animagus, with the ability to transform at will into a rat. After leaving Hogwarts, Pettigrew joins forces with Voldemort, and in exchange for his own life becomes Voldemort's spy within the Order of the Phoenix, of which Pettigrew is a member. When the Potters know that their son, Harry, is Voldemort's target, Sirius suggests to them to use Pettigrew as Secret-Keeper because he does not believe Voldemort would ever suspect a "weak, talentless thing" like Pettigrew. Pettigrew betrays the secret to Voldemort, an act that leads to James and Lily's deaths (and, ironically, Voldemort's near-destruction). Sirius seeks revenge on Pettigrew, but during the confrontation, Pettigrew publicly accuses Sirius of the Potters' deaths, murders twelve Muggles, and cuts off his own index finger before transforming into a rat, thereby framing Sirius for the betrayal of the Potters, as well as for his own murder and that of the bystanders. Despite having done these above treacherous acts, Pettigrew genuinely felt remorse to a certain extent for his betrayal. Pettigrew is (seemingly posthumously) awarded the Order of Merlin, and hides during the next twelve years. Wanting to keep an eye on the wizarding world, he masquerades as a rat, first as Percy Weasley's pet, and then as Ron Weasley's. In this form (named "Scabbers" by the family), he is missing a toe from one paw due to the finger he cut off.

Although Pettigrew appears in the first two books in the form of Scabbers, his identity is not revealed until Harry Potter and the Prisoner of Azkaban, in which he is the main antagonist. When a photograph of the Weasley family appears in the Daily Prophet newspaper, Sirius recognises Pettigrew's Animagus form and escapes from Azkaban to track him down. The two confront each other in the Shrieking Shack, where Lupin and Black compel Scabbers to resume his human form. Pettigrew confesses his treachery, claiming to have committed it only to save his own life. With Sirius and Lupin about to take their revenge, Harry begs Sirius to turn Pettigrew over to the Ministry of Magic instead, to prove Sirius' innocence. Pettigrew escapes while being led out of the Shack when Lupin transforms into a werewolf. Harry's actions result in Pettigrew owing him a life debt, and Pettigrew had in fact shown gratitude to Harry for sparing his life. This would be the reason behind Pettigrew (fruitlessly) trying to convince Voldemort to use the blood of another wizard when Voldemort wanted to use Harry's blood to restore his corporeal form in the next book.

Pettigrew returns to the service of Voldemort, seeking him out in the forests of Albania and helping him to return to a feeble baby's body. He abducts a Ministry of Magic employee named Bertha Jorkins, who is able to provide Voldemort with valuable information. Pettigrew (almost always referred to as "Wormtail" hereafter) assists Barty Crouch Jr. in overpowering Mad-Eye Moody, setting up the events in the fourth book, Harry Potter and the Goblet of Fire. In the climactic confrontation in that book, Pettigrew murders Cedric Diggory on Voldemort's orders, and brews the complex potion to regenerate Voldemort, severing his hand as one of the ingredients. Upon his return to corporeal form, Voldemort replaces Pettigrew's missing hand with a silver one that possesses five intact fingers and great strength. Despite his actions, Pettigrew's fortunes remain low; in Harry Potter and the Half-Blood Prince Snape treats him as a servant, and in Harry Potter and the Deathly Hallows he is tasked with keeping watch over prisoners in the cellar of Malfoy Manor. While Harry and Ron are being kept there, Pettigrew checks on the prisoners and is attacked. Pettigrew begins strangling Harry with the silver hand, but when reminded by Harry that he once saved his life, Pettigrew hesitates for a moment. The silver hand turns against him and strangles him to death as punishment for his moment of pity.

Pettigrew is portrayed by Timothy Spall as an adult, and by Charles Hughes as a teenager in the films. In Harry Potter and the Deathly Hallows – Part 1, Pettigrew is not strangled to death by his own silver hand in Malfoy Manor as in the book; he is instead struck by Dobby and collapses. It is unknown whether he was simply stunned or killed. He only appears in a flashback in Harry Potter and the Deathly Hallows – Part 2.

Severus Snape 

Severus Snape is characterised as a person of considerable complexity, whose coldly sarcastic and controlled exterior conceals deep emotions and anguish. In the first novel of the series, Snape is a teacher who is hostile from the start toward Harry and is built up to be the primary antagonist until the final chapters. As the series progresses, Snape's portrayal evolves from that of a malicious and partisan teacher to that of a complex, pivotal character of moral ambiguity, whose true loyalties are not revealed until the end. Snape is, as revealed in Harry Potter and the Deathly Hallows, actually a spy in Voldemort's ranks for Dumbledore. Alan Rickman plays Severus Snape in all eight movies.

Corban Yaxley 
Corban Yaxley is the brutal-faced Death Eater who is present in the battle in which Snape killed Dumbledore. He is one of the more prominent Death Eaters, and one of Voldemort's spies in the Ministry of Magic. In Harry Potter and the Deathly Hallows, Yaxley is invited to Malfoy Manor to witness the murder of Charity Burbage, and argues with Snape about the correct date of Harry's departure from the Dursleys', but John Dawlish, an Auror who is tricked by an Order member, gives him incorrect information. 

Yaxley places the Imperius Curse upon Pius Thicknesse, the Head of the Department of Magical Law Enforcement. He uses Thicknesse to Imperius the other major department heads and they allow Voldemort to murder Rufus Scrimgeour; thus Thicknesse becomes Minister for Magic.

When Harry, Ron, and Hermione, disguised as ministry officials, enter the Ministry to find Slytherin's locket, it is revealed that Yaxley has become Head of Magical Law Enforcement. He also assists Dolores Umbridge in leading the Muggle-Born Registration Commission, and the two seem to have a good relationship, together humiliating the Muggle-borns. Both are immobilised by Harry, but Yaxley recovers and grabs Hermione while she is Apparating her friends to safety. Yaxley arrives with them at Grimmauld Place, thus revealing their headquarters but not to the location that the trio subsequently apparate to.

He participates in the Battle of Hogwarts, where he duels with Professor Flitwick and is later seen among those who wait with Voldemort for Harry Potter to come to him, mistakenly believing that Harry would not come within the allotted time. When the battle resumes, he is defeated by George Weasley and Lee Jordan.

Peter Mullan appears as Yaxley in the film adaptation of Deathly Hallows.

In popular culture 

Mexican heavy metal band Velvet Darkness released the song "Death Eaters" in 2015 as part of their debut EP Delusion. It was later rerecorded in 2018 as bonus track for their debut LP Nothing But Glory, and a music video for the song was released in 2019 with a live recording of it.

References

External links 

 The Harry Potter Lexicon item on Death Eaters
 How to pronounce Bellatrix's name at the official Scholastic website
 PotterCast #40: Bag of 'trix – A podcast debating Bellatrix's role in the series
 When Harry Met Osama. Terrorism comes to Hogwarts.

Fictional cults
Fictional henchmen
Fictional organized crime groups
Fictional terrorist organizations
Fictional paramilitary organizations
Fictional outlaws
Fictional prison escapees
Fictional murderers
Fictional torturers
Harry Potter organisations
Lists of villains
Literary villains